7 (seven) is the natural number following 6 and preceding 8. It is the only prime number preceding a cube.

As an early prime number in the series of positive integers, the number seven has greatly symbolic associations in religion, mythology, superstition and philosophy. The seven Classical planets resulted in seven being the number of days in a week. It is often considered lucky in Western culture and is often seen as highly symbolic. Unlike Western culture, in Vietnamese culture, the number seven is sometimes considered unlucky.

In English, it is the first natural number whose pronunciation contains more than one syllable.

Evolution of the Arabic digit

In the beginning, Indians wrote 7 more or less in one stroke as a curve that looks like an uppercase  vertically inverted (ᒉ). The western Ghubar Arabs' main contribution was to make the longer line diagonal rather than straight, though they showed some tendencies to making the digit more rectilinear. The eastern Arabs developed the digit from a form that looked something like our 6 to one that looked like an uppercase V. Both modern Arab forms influenced the European form, a two-stroke form consisting of a horizontal upper stroke joined at its right to a stroke going down to the bottom left corner, a line that is slightly curved in some font variants. As is the case with the European digit, the Cham and Khmer digit for 7 also evolved to look like their digit 1, though in a different way, so they were also concerned with making their 7 more different. For the Khmer this often involved adding a horizontal line to the top of the digit. This is analogous to the horizontal stroke through the middle that is sometimes used in handwriting in the Western world but which is almost never used in computer fonts. This horizontal stroke is, however, important to distinguish the glyph for seven from the glyph for one in writing that uses a long upstroke in the glyph for 1. In some Greek dialects of the early 12th century the longer line diagonal was drawn in a rather semicircular transverse line. 

On the seven-segment displays of pocket calculators and digital watches, 7 is the digit with the most common graphic variation (1, 6 and 9 also have variant glyphs). Most calculators use three line segments, but on Sharp, Casio, and a few other brands of calculators, 7 is written with four line segments because in Japan, Korea and Taiwan 7 is written with a "hook" on the left, as ① in the following illustration.

Most people in Continental Europe, and some in Britain and Ireland as well as Latin America, write 7 with a line in the middle ("7"), sometimes with the top line crooked. The line through the middle is useful to clearly differentiate the digit from the digit one, as the two can appear similar when written in certain styles of handwriting. This form is used in official handwriting rules for primary school in Russia, Ukraine, Bulgaria, Poland, other Slavic countries, France, Italy, Belgium, the Netherlands, Finland, Romania, Germany, Greece, and Hungary.

Mathematics 
Seven, the fourth prime number, is not only a Mersenne prime (since ) but also a double Mersenne prime since the exponent, 3, is itself a Mersenne prime. It is also a Newman–Shanks–Williams prime, a Woodall prime, a factorial prime, a Harshad number, a lucky prime, a happy number (happy prime), a safe prime (the only ), a Leyland prime of the second kind and the fourth Heegner number.

Seven is the lowest natural number that cannot be represented as the sum of the squares of three integers. (See Lagrange's four-square theorem#Historical development.)

Seven is the aliquot sum of one number, the cubic number  and is the base of the 7-aliquot tree.

7 is the only number D for which the equation  has more than two solutions for n and x natural. In particular, the equation  is known as the Ramanujan–Nagell equation.

There are 7 frieze groups in two dimensions, consisting of symmetries of the plane whose group of translations is isomorphic to the group of integers. These are related to the 17 wallpaper groups whose transformations and isometries repeat two-dimensional patterns in the plane. The seventh indexed prime number is seventeen.

A seven-sided shape is a heptagon. The regular n-gons for n ⩽ 6 can be constructed by compass and straightedge alone, which makes the heptagon the first regular polygon that cannot be directly constructed with these simple tools. Figurate numbers representing heptagons are called heptagonal numbers. 7 is also a centered hexagonal number.
A heptagon in Euclidean space is unable to generate uniform tilings alongside other polygons, like the regular pentagon. However, it is one of fourteen polygons that can fill a plane-vertex tiling, in its case only alongside a regular triangle and a 42-sided polygon (3.7.42). This is also one of twenty-one such configurations from seventeen combinations of polygons, that features the largest and smallest polygons possible.

In Wythoff's kaleidoscopic constructions, seven distinct generator points that lie on mirror edges of a three-sided Schwarz triangle are used to create most uniform tilings and polyhedra; an eighth point lying on all three mirrors is technically degenerate, reserved to represent snub forms only. 
Seven of eight semiregular tilings are Wythoffian, the only exception is the elongated triangular tiling. Seven of nine uniform colorings of the square tiling are also Wythoffian, and between the triangular tiling and square tiling, there are seven non-Wythoffian uniform colorings of a total twenty-one that belong to regular tilings (all hexagonal tiling uniform colorings are Wythoffian). 
In two dimensions, there are precisely seven 7-uniform Krotenheerdt tilings, with no other such k-uniform tilings for k > 7, and it is also the only k for which the count of Krotenheerdt tilings agrees with k.

The Fano plane is the smallest possible finite projective plane with 7 points and 7 lines such that every line contains 3 points and 3 lines cross every point. With group order 168 = 23·3·7, this plane holds 35 total triples of points where 7 are collinear and another 28 are non-collinear, whose incidence graph is the 3-regular bipartate Heawood graph with 14 vertices and 21 edges. This graph embeds in three dimensions as the Szilassi polyhedron, the simplest toroidal polyhedron alongside its dual with 7 vertices, the Császár polyhedron.

In three-dimensional space there are seven crystal systems and fourteen Bravais lattices which classify under seven lattice systems, six of which are shared with the seven crystal systems. There are also collectively seventy-seven Wythoff symbols that represent all uniform figures in three dimensions. 

The seventh dimension is the only dimension aside from the familiar three where a vector cross product can be defined. This is related to the octonions over the imaginary subspace  in 7-space whose commutator between two octonions defines this vector product, wherein the Fano plane describes the multiplicative algebraic structure of the unit octonions , with  an identity element.
Also, the lowest known dimension for an exotic sphere is the seventh dimension, with a total of 28 differentiable structures; there may exist exotic smooth structures on the four-dimensional sphere.
In hyperbolic space, 7 is the highest dimension for non-simplex hypercompact Vinberg polytopes of rank n + 4 mirrors, where there is one unique figure with eleven facets. On the other hand, such figures with rank n + 3 mirrors exist in dimensions 4, 5, 6 and 8; not in 7. Hypercompact polytopes with lowest possible rank of n + 2 mirrors exist up through the 17th dimension, where there is a single solution as well.

There are seven fundamental types of catastrophes.

When rolling two standard six-sided dice, seven has a 6 in 6 (or ) probability of being rolled (1–6, 6–1, 2–5, 5–2, 3–4, or 4–3), the greatest of any number. The opposite sides of a standard six-sided dice always add to 7.

The Millennium Prize Problems are seven problems in mathematics that were stated by the Clay Mathematics Institute in 2000. Currently, six of the problems remain unsolved.

Basic calculations

In decimal 
 divided by 7 is exactly . Therefore, when a vulgar fraction with 7 in the denominator is converted to a decimal expansion, the result has the same six-digit repeating sequence after the decimal point, but the sequence can start with any of those six digits. For example,  and 

In fact, if one sorts the digits in the number 142,857 in ascending order, 124578, it is possible to know from which of the digits the decimal part of the number is going to begin with. The remainder of dividing any number by 7 will give the position in the sequence 124578 that the decimal part of the resulting number will start. For example, 628 ÷ 7 = ; here 5 is the remainder, and would correspond to number 7 in the ranking of the ascending sequence. So in this case, . Another example, hence the remainder is 2, and this corresponds to number 2 in the sequence. In this case, .

In science
 Seven colors in a rainbow: ROYGBIV
 Seven Continents
 Seven Seas
 Seven climes
 The neutral pH balance
 Number of music notes in a scale
 Number of spots most commonly found on ladybugs
 Atomic number for nitrogen

In psychology
 Seven, plus or minus two as a model of working memory.
 Seven psychological types called the Seven Rays in the teachings of Alice A. Bailey
 In Western culture, Seven is consistently listed as people's favorite number.
 When guessing numbers 1-10 the number 7 is most likely to be picked.
 Seven-year itch: happiness in marriage said to decline after 7 years

Classical antiquity
The Pythagoreans invested particular numbers with unique spiritual properties. The number seven was considered to be particularly interesting because it consisted of the union of the physical (number 4) with the spiritual (number 3). In Pythagorean numerology the number 7 means spirituality.

References from classical antiquity to the number seven include:

Seven Classical planets and the derivative Seven Heavens
Seven Wonders of the Ancient World
Seven metals of antiquity
Seven days in the week
Seven Seas
Seven Sages
Seven champions that fought Thebes
Seven hills of Rome and Seven Kings of Rome
Seven Sisters, the daughters of Atlas also known as the Pleiades

Religion and mythology

Judaism

The number seven forms a widespread typological pattern within Hebrew scripture, including:
Seven days (more precisely yom) of Creation, leading to the seventh day or Sabbath (Genesis 1)
Seven-fold vengeance visited on upon Cain for the killing of Abel (Genesis 4:15)
Seven pairs of every clean animal loaded onto the ark by Noah (Genesis 7:2)
Seven years of plenty and seven years of famine in Pharaoh's dream (Genesis 41)
Seventh son of Jacob, Gad, whose name means good luck (Genesis 46:16)
Seven times bullock's blood is sprinkled before God (Leviticus 4:6)
Seven nations God told the Israelites they would displace when they entered the land of Israel (Deuteronomy 7:1)
Seven days of the Passover feast (Exodus 13:3–10)
Seven-branched candelabrum or Menorah (Exodus 25)
Seven trumpets played by seven priests for seven days to bring down the walls of Jericho (Joshua 6:8)
Seven things that are detestable to God (Proverbs 6:16–19)
Seven Pillars of the House of Wisdom (Proverbs 9:1)
Seven archangels in the deuterocanonical Book of Tobit (12:15)

References to the number seven in Jewish knowledge and practice include:
Seven divisions of the weekly readings or aliyah of the Torah
Seven Jewish men (over the age of 13) called to read aliyahs in Shabbat morning services
Seven blessings recited under the chuppah during a Jewish wedding ceremony
Seven days of festive meals for a Jewish bride and groom after their wedding, known as Sheva Berachot or Seven Blessings
Seven Ushpizzin prayers to the Jewish patriarchs during the holiday of Sukkot

Christianity

Following the traditional of the Hebrew Bible, the New Testament likewise uses the number seven as part of a typological pattern:

Seven loaves multiplied into seven basketfuls of surplus (Matthew 15:32–37)
Seven demons were driven out of Mary Magdalene (Luke 8:2)
Seven last sayings of Jesus on the cross
Seven men of honest report, full of the Holy Ghost and wisdom (Acts 6:3)
Seven Spirits of God, Seven Churches and Seven Seals in the Book of Revelation

References to the number seven in Christian knowledge and practice include:
Seven Gifts of the Holy Spirit
Seven Corporal Acts of Mercy and Seven Spiritual Acts of Mercy
Seven deadly sins: lust, gluttony, greed, sloth, wrath, envy, and pride, and seven terraces of Mount Purgatory
Seven Virtues: chastity, temperance, charity, diligence, kindness, patience, and humility
Seven Joys and Seven Sorrows of the Virgin Mary
Seven Sleepers of Christian myth
Seven Sacraments in the Catholic Church (though some traditions assign a different number)

Islam
References to the number seven in Islamic knowledge and practice include:
Seven ayat in surat al-Fatiha, the first book of the holy Qur'an
Seven circumambulations of Muslim pilgrims around the Kaaba in Mecca during the Hajj and the Umrah
Seven walks between Al-Safa and Al-Marwah performed Muslim pilgrims during the Hajj and the Umrah
Seven doors to hell (for heaven the number of doors is eight)
Seven Earths and seven Heavens (plural of sky) mentioned in Qur'an (S. 65:12)
Night Journey to the Seventh Heaven, (reported ascension to heaven to meet God) Isra' and Mi'raj of the Qur'an and surah Al-Isra'.
Seventh day naming ceremony held for babies
Seven enunciators of divine revelation (nāṭiqs) according to the celebrated Fatimid Ismaili dignitary Nasir Khusraw
Circle Seven Koran, the holy scripture of the Moorish Science Temple of America

Hinduism 
References to the number seven in Hindu knowledge and practice include:
Seven worlds in the universe and seven seas in the world in Hindu cosmology
Seven sages or Saptarishi and their seven wives or Sapta Matrka in Hindu mythology
Seven Chakras in eastern philosophy
Seven stars in a constellation called "Saptharishi Mandalam" in Indian astronomy
Seven promises, or Saptapadi, and seven circumambulations around a fire at Hindu weddings
Seven virgin goddesses or Saptha Kannimar worshipped in temples in Tamil Nadu, India
Seven hills at Tirumala known as Yedu Kondalavadu in Telugu, or ezhu malaiyan in Tamil, meaning "Sevenhills God"
Seven steps taken by the Buddha at birth
Seven divine ancestresses of humankind in Khasi mythology
Seven octets or Saptak Swaras in Indian Music as the basis for Ragas compositions
Seven Social Sins listed by Mahatma Gandhi

Eastern tradition
Other references to the number seven in Eastern traditions include:

Seven Lucky Gods or gods of good fortune in Japanese mythology
Seven-Branched Sword in Japanese mythology
Seven Sages of the Bamboo Grove in China
Seven minor symbols of yang in Taoist yin-yang

Other references
Other references to the number seven in traditions from around the world include:
Seven palms in an Egyptian Sacred Cubit
Seven ranks in Mithraism
Seven hills of Istanbul
Seven islands of Atlantis
Seven Cherokee clans
Seven lives of cats in Iran and German and Romance language-speaking cultures
Seven fingers on each hand, seven toes on each foot and seven pupils in each eye of the Irish epic hero Cúchulainn
Seventh sons will be werewolves in Galician folklore, or the son of a woman and a werewolf in other European folklores
Seventh sons of a seventh son will be magicians with special powers of healing and clairvoyance in some cultures, or vampires in others
Seven prominent legendary monsters in Guaraní mythology
Seven gateways traversed by Inanna during her descent into the underworld
Seven Wise Masters, a cycle of medieval stories
Seven sister goddesses or fates in Baltic mythology called the Deivės Valdytojos.
Seven legendary Cities of Gold, such as Cibola, that the Spanish thought existed in South America
Seven years spent by Thomas the Rhymer in the faerie kingdom in the eponymous British folk tale
Seven-year cycle in which the Queen of the Fairies pays a tithe to Hell (or possibly Hel) in the tale of Tam Lin
Seven Valleys, a text by the Prophet-Founder Bahá'u'lláh in the Bahá'í faith
Seven superuniverses in the cosmology of Urantia
Seven psychological types called the Seven Rays in the teachings of Alice A. Bailey
Seven, the sacred number of Yemaya

In culture

In literature
 Seven Dwarfs
 The Seven Brothers, a 1870 novel by Aleksis Kivi
 Seven features prominently in A Song of Ice and Fire by George R. R. Martin, namely, the Seven Kingdoms and the Faith of the Seven

In visual art
The Group of Seven Canadian landscape painters

In sports
 Sports with seven players per side
 Kabaddi
 Rugby sevens
 Water Polo
 Netball
 Handball
 Flag Football
 Ultimate Frisbee
 Seven is the least number of players a soccer team must have on the field in order for a match to start and continue.
 A touchdown plus an extra point is worth seven points.

See also

Diatonic scale (7 notes)
Seven colors in the rainbow
Seven continents
Seven liberal arts
Seven Wonders of the Ancient World
Seven days of the Week
Septenary (numeral system)
Year Seven (School)
Se7en (disambiguation)
Sevens (disambiguation)
One-seventh area triangle
 Z with stroke (Ƶ)
List of highways numbered 7

Notes

References
Wells, D. The Penguin Dictionary of Curious and Interesting Numbers London: Penguin Group (1987): 70–71

Integers
7 (number)